R85 is a candidate luminous blue variable star.

R85 may also refer to:
 , a destroyer of the Royal Navy
 R-85 Munich/Neubiberg, a former airfield of the United States Army Air Forces in Germany